B-Side Collection may refer to:

B-Side Collection (Harem Scarum album), released in Japan only
The B-Side Collection, Maroon 5
B-Sides Collection (Spiderbait album), Spiderbait
B-Side Collection, Gomez
B-Side Collection, Mariko Kouda

See also
List of B-side compilation albums